John Charlesworth may refer to:

 John Charlesworth (American football) (1902–1962), American football player
 John Charlesworth (abolitionist) (1782–1864), English abolitionist and Anglican clergyman
 John Charlesworth (politician) (1815–1880), British colliery owner and Member of Parliament
 John Kaye Charlesworth (1889–1972), British geologist and academic author